The 1983–84 FIBA European Champions Cup was the 27th season of the European Champions Cup club competition (now called EuroLeague). The Final was held at the Patinoire des Vernets in Geneva, Switzerland on March 29, 1984. Banco di Roma won its first title, defeating Spanish side, FC Barcelona, by a result of 79–73.

Competition system

 25 teams (European national domestic league champions, plus the then current title holders), playing in a tournament system, played knock-out rounds on a home and away basis. The aggregate score of both games decided the winner.
 The six remaining teams after the knock-out rounds entered a Semifinal Group Stage, which was played as a round-robin. The final standing was based on individual wins and defeats. In the case of a tie between two or more teams after the group stage, the following criteria were used: 1) number of wins in one-to-one games between the teams; 2) basket average between the teams; 3) general basket average within the group.
 The winner and the runner-up of the Semifinal Group Stage qualified for the final, which was played at a predetermined venue.

Preliminary round

|}

First round

|}

Second round

|}

Semifinal group stage

Final

March 29, Patinoire des Vernets, Geneva

|}

Awards

FIBA European Champions Cup Finals Top Scorer
 J.A. San Epifanio "Epi" ( FC Barcelona)

References

External links
1983–84 FIBA European Champions Cup
 1983–84 FIBA European Champions Cup
 Men Basketball European Champions Cup 1984
 Champions Cup 1983–84 Line-ups and Stats

EuroLeague seasons
FIBA